The Battle of Ciudad Real was fought on 27 March 1809 and resulted in a French victory under General Sebastiani against the Spanish under General Conde de Cartojal.

Background
The Spanish campaign in early 1809 started with the Battle of Uclés.

Battle
French 4th Corps (with attached Polish division under general Valance) had to cross the bridge over the Guadiana River which was defended by the Spanish corps of Count Urbina Cartaojal. Polish lancers of the Legion of the Vistula under colonel Jan Konopka charged through the bridge taking it by surprise, then outflanked Spanish infantry and attacked it from behind as the main French and Polish forces crossed the bridge, and attacked the Spanish front lines.

The battle was over when undisciplined Spanish soldiers dispersed, and began to retreat in the direction of Santa Cruz.
Józef Rudnicki, adjutant-major of the 4th Infantry Regiment of the Legion, described the battle in his diaries (spelling according to the original):

"as soon as the French regiments of the 4th Corps met our division, we rushed immediately toward the Consuegra and Ciudad Real, before of which town we found the Spanish corps, waiting for us on good positions. We were outnumbered, but thanks to the rational orders of the general Sebastiani, in some od four hours on 27 March 1809 the Spaniards were defeated and dispersed. They were retreating in chaos toward Almagro, where the Order of Calatrava has its home, and toward the Santa Cruz de Mudela, and even further, into the Sierramorena Mountains."

Results
The Spanish corps lost some 2000 men killed or wounded and many more were taken prisoner. After the battle the count of Cartojal was deprived of command for incompetency, and replaced by general Venegas, hero of the Spanish War of Independence, and later the viceroy of New Spain.

Aftermath
The Spanish campaign in early 1809 proceeded with the first Madrid offensive in the Battle of Medellín.

Notes

References

Further reading

External links
 
 

Conflicts in 1809
Battles of the Napoleonic Wars
Battles in Castilla–La Mancha
Battles involving Spain
1809 in Spain
1809 in France
March 1809 events
History of the province of Ciudad Real